Shim On (1375 – 18 January 1419) was a Korean politician. He was the Chief State Councillor of the Korean Joseon from September 1418 to December 1418 and the father of Queen Soheon and father-in-law to King Sejong. He is known for his treason charges, which eventually led to his death and further strengthening of the royal power.

Family 
Father:  Shim Deok-bu (심덕부), Count Cheongseong (청성백)
Mother: Lady Mun of Incheon Mun clan (인천 문씨), daughter of Mun Pildae ( 문필대)
Wife:
Internal Princess Consort Samhanguk of the Sunheung Ahn clan (? – 1444) (삼한국대부인 순흥 안씨), daughter of Ahn Cheon-Bo (안천보)
Son: Sim Jun (심준) (? - 1448)
Daughter-in-law - Lady Min of the Yeoheung Min clan (여흥 민씨); Queen Wongyeong's grandniece 
Grandson: Sim Mi (심미)
Grandson: Sim  Chi (심치)
Son: Sim Hoe (심회, 沈澮) (1418 - 1493)
Son: Sim Gyeol (심결, 沈決) (1419 - 1470)
Daughter:  Queen Soheon of Cheongseong Sim clan
Son-in-law: King Sejong of Joseon
Granddaughter: Princess Jeongso (1412 – 25 February 1424) (정소공주)
Grandson: Yi Hyang, King Munjong (15 November 1414 – 1 June 1452) (조선 문종)
Granddaughter: Princess Jeongui (1415 – 11 February 1477) (정의공주)
Grandson: Yi Yu, King Sejo (2 November 1417 – 23 September 1468) (조선 세조)
Grandson:  Yi Yong, Grand Prince Anpyeong (18 October 1418 – 18 November 1453) (이용 안평대군)
Grandson: Yi Gu, Grand Prince Imyeong (7 January 1420 – 21 January 1469) (이구 임영대군)
Grandson: Yi Yeo, Grand Prince Gwangpyeong (2 May 1425 – 7 December 1444) (이여 광평대군)
Grandson: Yi Yu, Grand Prince Geumseong (28 March 1426 – 21 October 1457) (이유 금성대군)
Grandson: Yi Im, Grand Prince Pyeongwon (18 November 1427 – 16 January 1445) (이임 평원대군)
Grandson: Yi Yeom, Grand Prince Yeongeung (23 May 1434 – 2 February 1467) (이염 영응대군)
Daughter: Lady Sim of the Cheongsong Sim clan (청송 심씨)
Son-in-law - Kang Seok-deok (강석덕, 姜碩德) (1395 - 1459) of the Jinju Kang clan (진주 강씨)
Grandson: Kang Hui-an (강희안, 姜希顔) (1419 - 1464)
Grandson: Kang Hui-maeng (강희맹, 姜希孟) (1424 - 1483)
Granddaughter: Royal Noble Consort Yeong of the Jinju Kang clan (영빈 강씨) (? - 1483)
Granddaughter: Lady Kang of the Jinju Kang clan 
Daughter: Lady Sim of the Cheongsong Sim clan (청송 심씨)
Daughter: Lady Sim of the Cheongsong Sim clan (청송 심씨)
Daughter: Lady Sim of the Cheongsong Sim clan (청송 심씨)
Daughter: Lady Sim of the Cheongsong Sim clan (청송 심씨)
Unknown: 
Son: Sim Jang-su (심장수, 沈長壽)
Son: Sim Jang-gi (심장기, 沈長己

Background
Born of the Cheongsong Shim clan (靑松 沈氏), during the late Goryeo Dynasty, he passed the examinations and entered the government at age eleven. At that time, general Yi Seong-gye had full control of the government and had eliminated most of his rivals throughout Goryeo. Shim On, fully realizing that the Goryeo dynasty was at its end, joined Yi's faction and worked hard in bringing about a new dynasty. Finally, when General Yi rose to the throne in 1392, Shim On was one of those who gained a new post and influence in assisting Yi found the Joseon Dynasty.

In 1411, under King Taejong's rule, Shim On was appointed to the post of administrating the province of Hamgyong-do. He dismissed corrupt sheriffs and judges, and toiled in improving the governmental power in the region.

As Shim On was a very capable civil administrator, he was promoted several times, and also worked in the roles of the Minister of Industry, Civil Affairs and Agriculture. When the court began selecting the candidates for the princess consort of Chungnyeong (later King Sejong]), he included his daughter in the candidacy, resulting in her selection.

When Chungnyeong became king in the year 1418, Shim's daughter "Lady Shim" (심씨; 沈氏, women were referred by only their family names) became Queen Soheon, and Shim On rose to the office of Chief State Councilor the highest non-royal role in the country.

Scandal and demise
When Shim On was appointed to the office of Chief State Councilor, the office of the Left State Councilor was occupied Park Eun (박은; 朴訔), of the Bannam Park clan. The relationship between these two ministers was hostile, and there were frequent disputes between them.

At the time, King Taejong had resigned from his post of monarch and occupied the post of Retired King (태상왕; 太上王). However, most of the nation's internal and external affairs were run by Taejong, and the current King Sejong remained as a figurehead. As he was a general during the late Koryo days, Taejong was a firm, conservative, totalitarian despot. He frequently worried about the fact that, in the future, the dynasty would be ruled mostly by ministers, rather than by the Crown, like the Goryeo Dynasty. Therefore, he took extensive measures to strengthen the authority of the royal court.

Due to this fact in the government, Shim-On's younger brother Shim Jeong, complained that the King's power was totally limited by the looming presence of Taejong. When this statement reached the ears of the Retired King, he condemned the whole Shim family. As Shim-On, Chief State Councilor and father of the queen, was one of the most influential men of the country, his presence could not be ignored.

Furthermore, Left State Councilor Park Eun framed Shim On by revealing that On's influence was overflowing. At this time, Shim-On had fulfilled his duty of Chief State Councilor by visiting the Ming Empire as an emissary of Joseon at Saeunsa (사은사; 謝恩使). He was just returning from his trip when he was arrested at the Korean territory of Uiju (의주; 義州) and transported under custody to the capital Hanyang, then to the city of Suwon (수원; 水原).

At Suwon he was tortured into admitting his crimes. Led by Park Eun, who had framed Shim in the first place, the torture eventually achieved its goal of a confession of crimes from Shim On. Just before the Chief State Councilor was executed, however, he muttered the famous phrase, "My descendants. . .Do not marry a Park. It will bring shame and misfortune to the family."

Aftermath
After Shim On was executed for his fabricated crimes, Park Eun was promoted to Chief State Councilor. Many of the Shim family were condemned, and even the Queen Soheon was threatened to be stripped of her title as queen. However, King Sejong tried to protect her, and succeeded. King Taejong also supported Queen Soheon, telling the minister not to mention the matter of stripping Queen Soheon's title.

However, Shim-On's name became a taboo during the remainder of Taejong's presence. Even Sejong could not regain the dignity of the minister's name. However, when Sejong and Queen Soheon's son King Munjong rose to the throne, Shim-On was absolved of his crimes, and posthumously reinstated to the office of Chief State Councilor. He was also made a lord, and is also known as Lord of Anhyo (안효공; 安孝公).

The Shim family continued to prosper, with Shim-On's second son Shim Hwe becoming Chief State Councilor during King Sejo's reign.

Controversy
700 years after the incident, the Shim and Park families have still not reconciled about the incident, with the Shim family blaming Park Eun for the framing about treason. However, historians generally agree that Park was merely a tool in Taejong's master plan of royal totalitarianism. As Taejong was a conservative king, he did not want a queen's family gaining power and influence over the Joseon Dynasty. As his mindset was educated in the Goryeo Dynasty,  he had come to believe in the danger of handing over power to another, non-royal family.but he knew alone Sim On was direct decendent of king jumun of korye dynasty.

In popular culture
 Portrayed by Choi Sang-hoon in the 2008 KBS2 TV series King Sejong the Great.
 Portrayed by Han In-soo in the 2011 SBS TV series Deep Rooted Tree.
 Portrayed by Jung Kyu-soo in the 2015 MBC TV series Splash Splash Love.

References

External links
Chongsong Shim Family Clan homepage

1375 births
1418 deaths
15th-century executions
15th-century Korean people
Executed Korean people
Joseon scholar-officials
People executed by Korea
People from North Gyeongsang Province